The UAB Blazers men's basketball team represents the University of Alabama at Birmingham (UAB) in the NCAA Division I men's college basketball, and have competed in Conference USA (C-USA) since 1995.

History

The UAB Blazers started their athletics program with the creation of men's basketball in 1978.  Setting high standards from the start, UAB was able to lure Gene Bartow away from his post as the head coach at UCLA to start the Blazer program. Known as the "Father of UAB athletics," Coach Bartow was able to guide the Blazers to early success by reaching the NCAA tournament in just their third season of existence.  Since their inaugural season, the Blazers have made 15 appearances in the NCAA men's basketball tournament, and 12 appearances in the National Invitational Tournament.  UAB has been productive in its NCAA tournament appearances, reaching the Elite Eight once, and the Sweet Sixteen 3 times. After 40 years of basketball, UAB has had 36 winning seasons, including 24 seasons with at least 20 wins. UAB's win percentage ranks 30th among NCAA Division I basketball programs with at least 40 seasons.  UAB's basketball program has featured wins over many of basketball's most historic programs, including Kentucky, North Carolina, Indiana, Louisville, Kansas, Arizona, Michigan State, Virginia, Villanova, Connecticut and many others.

Conference affiliations
 1978–79 – NCAA Division I Independent
 1979–80 to 1990–91 – Sun Belt Conference
 1991–92 to 1994–95 – Great Midwest Conference
 1995–96 to present – Conference USA

UAB Head Coaches

UAB Season-By-Season Records

Postseason Results

NCAA tournament results
UAB has appeared in 16 NCAA Tournaments, with a combined record of 10–16.

NIT results
UAB has appeared in the National Invitation Tournament 13 times, with a combined record of 16–12.

CBI Results
The Blazers have appeared in the College Basketball Invitational (CBI) one time. Their record is 0–1

Highest Seeds Beaten in NCAA tournament

UAB Rivalry Games

Awards

Conference Coach of the Year

Conference Player of the Year

All--Conference Players Since 2012

Blazers of Note

Retired numbers

UAB has retired four jersey numbers since its inception and they now hang from the rafters of Bartow Arena.  This honor is bestowed only on players who earn AP All-America honors and who complete their degree at UAB.

In the NBA
UAB has seen numerous players move on to professional careers in the NBA. Some of UAB's highest NBA draft picks include:
 Oliver Robinson (2nd Round/1st Pick/24th Overall) to the San Antonio Spurs
 Walter Sharpe (2nd Round/2nd Pick/32nd Overall) to the Seattle SuperSonics
 Steve Mitchell (2nd Round/12th Pick/36th Overall) to the Washington Bullets
 Robert Vaden (2nd Round/54th Overall) to the Charlotte Bobcats

Other former Blazers to play in the NBA are:
 McKinley Singleton (New York Knicks – 1986–87)
 Alan Ogg (Miami Heat – 1990–92; Milwaukee Bucks – 1992–93; Washington Bullets – 1992–93)
 Stanley Jackson (Minnesota Timberwolves – 1993–94)
 Donell Taylor (Washington Wizards – 2005–07)
 Carldell "Squeaky" Johnson (New Orleans Hornets – 2011–12)
 Elijah Millsap (Utah Jazz – 2015)

In international leagues

Paul Delaney (class of 2004), basketball player in the Israeli National League

UAB Basketball Facilities

UAB initially played their home games at the BJCC Coliseum, but moved their home games to an on-campus facility starting with the 1988–89 season. Originally known as UAB Arena, the name was officially changed to Bartow Arena on January 25, 1997. The 8,508-seat arena is named after Coach Gene Bartow, the man who built UAB's men's basketball program from scratch starting in 1978.

References

General

Specific

External links
 

 
1978 establishments in Alabama